The Tomb of Sayyid Hassan Modarres is the burial site of Sayyid Hassan Modares, former prime minister of Iran. It was built in 1937 in Kashmar, Iran, as opposed to using the former tomb of Kashmar in the vast gardens of Kashmar. The tomb building consists of a central dome, four dock and a dome made of turquoise, in the style of Islamic architecture and the Safavid dynasty. Seyed Hassan Modares lived during the Pahlavi dynasty and was from the Sadat of Tabatabai. He was a political constitutionalist. He was born in a village in Ardestan in 1870 and moved to Tehran and joined the second national legislature. In the year 1928, he was kept in secret and then exiled to Kashmar. He was one of those who opposed a republic because he believed in an Islamic Republic. In accordance with the law of interest and when Reza Shah thought that President Kemal Atatürk would bring the dreams to the King of Khan, eventually ended in 1937 in the city of Kashmar, representatives of Reza Shah killed.

Hassan Modarres Museum 
The Hassan Modarres Museum is a Museum belongs to the 21st century and is located in Kashmar, Razavi Khorasan Province in Iran.

References 

Mausoleums in Iran
Buildings and structures in Iran
Burial monuments and structures
Buildings and structures in Kashmar
National works of Iran
Tourist attractions in Razavi Khorasan Province